The New Inn  is a Grade II listed public house on Ham Common,  Ham in the London Borough of Richmond upon Thames. It dates from the 18th century.

It was used as a filming location for the pub of the same name in The Sandman (TV Series).

References

External links

 1700s establishments in England
Commercial buildings completed in the 18th century
Grade II listed pubs in London
Grade II listed buildings in the London Borough of Richmond upon Thames
Ham, London
Pubs in the London Borough of Richmond upon Thames